Stroncone is a comune (municipality) in the Province of Terni in the Italian region Umbria, located about 70 km southeast of Perugia and about 8 km south of Terni.

Geography
Located in southern Umbria, nearby the borders with Lazio, the municipality borders with Calvi dell'Umbria, Configni (RI), Cottanello (RI), Greccio (RI), Narni, Otricoli, Rieti (RI) and Terni.

It counts the hamlets (frazioni) of Aguzzo, Coppe, Finocchieto and Vasciano.

History
Although some have wanted to identify the Stroncone with the ancient Roman town of Trebula Suffena, there is no reliable documentation for this. It is more likely the settlement arose during the early Middle Ages, perhaps starting around a small defensive element, a watch-tower guarding a route important for that time. Stroncone was, in fact, in a border area between the Longobard Duchy of Spoleto and the territory under the control of the Byzantine Empire. Ugo, one of the Dukes of Spoleto, Ugo (or Hugh), likely gave name to the original "castrum Hugonis", later corrupted in "Castrugone", "Strungone" and finally "Stroncone".

The first document attesting to the existence of place dates back to 1012, when Giovanni di Pietro gave to the monastery of San Simeone his possessions located in the territory of Stroncone, the houses and casalini that he owns within the "castle" of Stroncone and his portion of the church of Sant'Angelo, which is called "oratory" on this date.

The documents from the XI century confirm the existence of a well-defined settlement, a true castle, with fortifications and walls, inside which there are houses, a square, and places of worship. During this period, Stroncone is gravitating to Narni's orbit, as well as being part of the diocesan territory of this city. In order to counter the expansive policy of the town of Narni, and till then disputed between the municipalities of Terni and Rieti, and with the aim of restructuring the Pontifical State, Innocent III will grant Stroncone municipal autonomy in 1215 (LANZI 1895). From this moment on, Stroncone residents favor the Guelph faction; the coat of arms of the commune has the pontifical keys atop a white cross on red background. Stroncone allied with Narni in supporting the Pope's army against the imperial troops of Frederick II of Swabia, supported by the municipality of Terni. By 14th century, still following the destiny of Narni, The town appears ruled by the rectors of the Pontifical State (Ugo Augeri, Bernardus De Lacu, Pietro di Vico, Girolamo Orsini, Francesco Orsini, and Nicola Orsini). During the Avignonese exile of the popes, vicars of the Holy See who govern through a commissioner.

In January 1378, the municipality of Stroncone, a small "walled wall" in the diocese of Narni, was recognized by Gregory XI as the land subject to the Holy See, a privilege which was reconfirmed later by Leo X. According to Lanzi, in 1394 the fort was occupied by Pandolfo Malatesta and in 1404 by Andrea Tomacelli: on this latter occasion the fortress would have been partly destroyed by Stronconesi himself to get rid of the stately garrison and subsequently rebuilt, and by 1493, at the passage of Pius II Piccolomini, the place was noted to be "very full".

Stroncone, along with other Guelph centers such as Narni and Miranda, likely suffered looting during the passage in 1527 of imperial troops, the Lanzichenecchi. The signs of subsequent reconstruction are still evident in many buildings, especially in the isolation of the municipal building and in the walls. The political and economic influence of the minorites in the life of the city from the fifteenth century should not be forgotten, helping Stroncone to become a major Umbrian economic center, hosting a Monte di Pietà (1466) and a Monte Frumentario (1489) with the aim of combating illicit and immoral economic activities.

In the 16th century the land was ruled by the cardinals of the Sacred College through the office of the podestà, while by the end of the sixteenth century, with the administrative reform of the papal state introduced by Sixtus V, the center was submitted directly to the Apostolic Chamber, from the pontiff himself and was governed by a resident apostolic commissioner. For this reason, as in other centers of the papal state (see the case of Rieti and Terni), beside the aisle palace, the headquarters of the local government, was built the apostolic palace, the peripheral seat of the central government, with the residence of the governor and the annexed jails, an expression of the judicial power that the governor exemplified. At the end of the 15th century, the castrum, or castle-hamlet, had a population of just five hundred souls. While the countryside did not reach six hundred fireplaces, it was not divided into territorial divisions, but in the two parishes of Sant'Angelo and San Nicolò. While there were no parochial boundaries, the two colleges had mixed care and also "in the funeral one acted and exercised the other's care."

In the town there were three confraternities: in the square of San Giovanni there was the Society of Mercy serving as a hospital (it was in fact the San Rocco hospital); near the piazza della Rocca, the Compagnia del Gonfalone, directed by the Friars Minor; the Brotherhood of the Sacrament at Santa Maria di Piazza, then called San Giovanni Vecchio and finally Santa Maria della Porta, all of which are aggregated to the namesake archconfraternities of Rome.

Among the most significant modern events, was the resistance sustained by the inhabitants of Stroncone against the French troops of Napoleon, which penetrated the town walls only after a siege of seven days and deceit. When it joined the Kingdom of Italy, Stroncone was united to the municipality of Terni in 1929. Only after the Second World War in 1947 it regained its administrative autonomy.

Main sights
Santa Lucia Stroncone Astronomical Observatory

Personalities
Asprilio Pacelli (1570-1623), Baroque composer, born in the hamlet of Vasciano

Transport 
Stroncone has a stop on the Terni–Sulmona railway, with trains to Terni, Rieti and L'Aquila.

See also 
 5609 Stroncone

References

External links

 Official website

Cities and towns in Umbria